Sarla International Academy is a school in Basti District and is affiliated to CBSE (Central Board of Secondary Education). The school has three floors and in floor school hostel is located. On the second floor of Sarla International Academy are the classes of senior students and on its ground floor the classes of junior students. Its official website is under construction. The school is owned by Manish Jaiswal, who is a something in the politics line. The schools is from nursery class to class 11th.

Sarla international school is located in Basti (U.P.) The school was launched on 1 April 2007, with a capacity of 150 air conditioned classrooms. The school has three floors. The top floor is occupied by hostel and an auditorium which is under construction. The ground floor consist of a reception area and classes for junior students. The school has two grounds and has the largest building in the city. It is an English medium school affiliated by C.B.S.E. The school holds the record of giving largest number of toppers in board examination with a total of 15 student which is largest in the city.

Details 
Year of Foundation   -  2004
Date of First Opening of School    -  4/1/2004
Name of Principal/ Head of Institution -   Richard William
Status of The School      -  Senior Secondary

References

External links
 Official Website

International schools in India
High schools and secondary schools in Uttar Pradesh
Schools in Basti
Educational institutions established in 2005
2005 establishments in Uttar Pradesh